"A Small Talent for War" is the second segment of the fifteenth episode from the first season (1985–86) of the television series The Twilight Zone. In this segment, an advanced alien race claims to have created human beings and proposes to wipe them out unless they change their ways.

Plot
The scene is set with the United Nations Security Council bickering between nations over how to respond to the appearance of an extraterrestrial vessel near the council building.

An ambassador from an alien race then appears to them and claims that his race seeded life on Earth millions of years earlier. He tells them that his race is displeased with humanity's "small talent for war," as they have failed to produce the potential that the aliens had nurtured, and his fleet will destroy all life on Earth. The Security Council pleads for and is granted a 24-hour reprieve to prove humanity's worth.

The Security Council and the General Assembly negotiate an accord for lasting global peace and present it to the alien ambassador. He is amused at the peace accord and explains that his race was, in fact, seeking a greater talent for war, as they had genetically seeded thousands of planets to breed warriors to fight for them across the galaxy. They perceived humanity's conflicts as erratic and clumsy, our weapons as crude and primitive, and our longing for peace as a fatal flaw. As the ambassador calls down his fleet to destroy Earth, he thanks the Security Council for an amusing day.

External links
 
 Episode "A Small Talent for War" on Vimeo

References 

The Twilight Zone (1985 TV series season 1) episodes
1986 American television episodes
Television episodes about ancient astronauts
Works by Carter Scholz

fr:Risque de paix mondiale